Aberfoyle River, a watercourse that is part of the Clarence River catchment, is located in the New England and Northern Tablelands districts of New South Wales, Australia.

Course and features
Aberfoyle River rises on the slopes of the Great Dividing Range, at Llangothlin, north of Guyra, and flows generally south southeast, east southeast, northeast, and east northeast, joined by three minor tributaries towards its confluence with the Guy Fawkes River, below Chaelundi Mountain, within Guy Fawkes River National Park. The river descends  over its  course.

The Devils Chimney in the Aberfoyle River gorge was declared an Aboriginal Place on 8 August 1980. An Aboriginal Place is an area of special significance to Aboriginal culture and declaration provides recognition of the significance of the area and its heritage values which relate to traditions, observances, customs, beliefs or history of Aboriginal people.

See also 

 Rivers of New South Wales

References 

 

Rivers of New South Wales
Northern Rivers
New England (New South Wales)